Donen is a surname.  Notable people with the surname include:

Joshua Donen (born 1955), American film producer, son of Stanley
Stanley Donen (1924–2019), American film director and choreographer

See also
Donan
Donnan (surname)
Donnan (disambiguation)